The racquetball competition at the 2014 Central American and Caribbean Games was held at the Racquet Complex in Leyes de Reforma Sports Complex in Veracruz, Mexico, from 15 to 24 November.

There were individual competitions in men's and women's singles and doubles 15–21 November with men's and women's team competitions on 22–24 November.

Mexican players are the incumbent Central American and Caribbean Games champions in all divisions. In 2010, Alvaro Beltran of Mexico won men's singles, Javier Moreno and Polo Gutierrez of Mexico won men's doubles, Paola Longoria of Mexico won women's singles, and Samantha Salas and Susana Acosta of Mexico won women's doubles.

Mexico also won the men's and women's team competitions. Beltran, Moreno, Gutierrez and Gilberto Meija were the men's team with  Longoria, Salas, Acosta and Jessica Parrilla on the women's team.

Medal summary

Men's events

Women's events

Medal table

Result Summaries

Men's singles

Men's doubles

Women's singles

Women's doubles

References

External links
Official Website

2014 Central American and Caribbean Games events
2014
2014 in racquetball
Qualification tournaments for the 2015 Pan American Games
Racquetball in Mexico